Events from the year 1570 in Ireland.

Incumbent
Monarch: Elizabeth I

Events
January – William Oge Martyn is kidnapped by the Earl of Thomond.
April – Battle of Shrule occurs.
October 10 – Sir Edmund Butler of Cloughgrenan surrenders his estate to Elizabeth I of England in exchange for a pardon for his rebellion.

Births
Col Ciotach, adventurer of Clan Donald, Laird of Colonsay (d. 1647)
Tadhg mac Dáire Mac Bruaideadha, Gaelic poet and historian (d. 1652)

Deaths

References

 
1570s in Ireland
Ireland
Years of the 16th century in Ireland